The eighth Women's U.S. Cup tournament held in 2002, were joined by four teams: Australia, Italy, Russia and USA.
This was the last Women's U.S. Cup.

Matches

Final placing

Goal scorers

References 

2002
2002 in women's association football
2002 in American women's soccer
2002–03 in Italian women's football
2002–03 in Australian women's soccer
2002 in Russian football
September 2002 sports events in the United States
October 2002 sports events in the United States